The 2011 Welsh Conservatives leadership election was held on 14 July 2011. Andrew RT Davies defeated Nick Ramsay, the only other candidate.

Following the 2011 Assembly election the party's leader Nick Bourne lost his Mid and West Wales seat. Paul Davies then became the interim leader whilst an election took place. The contest then consisted of Andrew RT Davies (South Wales Central) against Ramsay (Monmouth). Andrew RT Davies won with some 53.1 per cent of the vote on a 49 per cent turnout of the party's Welsh membership.

Candidates

Result 

The conservative Party did not release the raw vote figures only the percentages won.

Andrew RT Davies was declared the result and thus became the Leader of the Opposition in the National Assembly for Wales.

References

2011 elections in the United Kingdom
Conservative Party (UK)
2011 in Wales
2010s elections in Wales
Political party leadership elections in Wales
Welsh Conservatives leadership election